The 2011 San Diego State Aztecs football team represented San Diego State University in the 2011 NCAA Division I FBS football season. The Aztecs were led by first-year head coach Rocky Long and played their home games at Qualcomm Stadium. They are members of the Mountain West Conference. They finished the season 9–4, 4–3 in Mountain West play to finish fourth place. They were invited to the New Orleans Bowl where they lost, but then eventually won a forfeited game to Louisiana–Lafayette.

Schedule

References

San Diego State
San Diego State Aztecs football seasons
San Diego State Aztecs football